Honnavalli is an Indian village in Tiptur Taluk in Karnataka State. It has an average elevation of 820 metres (2693 feet).

History 

Honnavalli is a village headquarters about 10 miles northwest of Tiptur in Tumkur District. Honnavalli was the Taluk headquarters until 1889.  The history of the village dates back to the eleventh century. It was built by one Someswararaya who belonged to the Harnahalli Nayak family.  Legend says 'Honnu Amma' the family deity of the Palegar appeared in his dream and directed him to build a model village in her name.  Even today 'Honnavalli Amma' is the Village Goddess.

References 

Villages in Tumkur district
Articles lacking sources from July 2018